Park Kyung-hwa (also Park Gyeong-hwa, ; born August 29, 1984) is a South Korean former swimmer, who specialized in butterfly events. She won a bronze medal as a member of the South Korean team in the 4 × 100 m medley relay (4:13.41), when her nation hosted the 2002 Asian Games in Busan.

Park qualified for the women's 100 m butterfly at the 2004 Summer Olympics in Athens, by clearing a FINA B-standard entry time of 1:01.79 from the Dong-A Swimming Tournament in Seoul. She challenged seven other swimmers on the second heat, including five-time Olympian Mette Jacobsen of Denmark. She rounded out the field to last place by a tenth of a second (0.10) behind Hong Kong's Sze Hang Yu in 1:02.52. Park failed to advance into the semifinals, as she placed thirty-third overall on the first day of preliminaries.

References

1984 births
Living people
South Korean female butterfly swimmers
Olympic swimmers of South Korea
Swimmers at the 2004 Summer Olympics
Swimmers at the 2002 Asian Games
Asian Games medalists in swimming
Asian Games bronze medalists for South Korea
Medalists at the 2002 Asian Games